Zhigayevo is a rural locality in Vablinsky Selsoviet Rural Settlement, Konyshyovsky District, Kursk Oblast, Russia. Population:

Geography 
The village is located on the Zhigayevka River (a left tributary of the Svapa River), 75.5 km from the Russia–Ukraine border, 62 km north-west of Kursk, 25 km north-west of the district center – the urban-type settlement Konyshyovka, 10.5 km from the selsoviet center – Vablya.

 Climate
Zhigayevo has a warm-summer humid continental climate (Dfb in the Köppen climate classification).

Transport 
Zhigayevo is located 24 km from the federal route  Crimea Highway, 5 km from the road of regional importance  (Fatezh – Dmitriyev), on the road  (Konyshyovka – Zhigayevo – 38K-038), 17.5 km from the nearest railway station Sokovninka (railway line Navlya – Lgov-Kiyevsky).

The rural locality is situated 61.5 km from Kursk Vostochny Airport, 169 km from Belgorod International Airport and 257 km from Voronezh Peter the Great Airport.

References

Notes

Sources

Rural localities in Konyshyovsky District
Dmitriyevsky Uyezd